Catherine "Kit" Ann Chesla is an American nurse who is Professor Emeritus and former Thelma Shobe Endowed Chair at the University of California, San Francisco School of Nursing. Her research has considered families and chronic illness.

Early life and education 
Chesla was an undergraduate student at the College of Saint Teresa, where she earned her bachelor's degree in nursing in 1974. She moved to the University of Washington for graduate studies, where she earned a Master of Science in Nursing in 1978. Her Master's research considered social participation and alienation amongst migrant communities. Afterwards, she joined the University of California, San Francisco, where she completed her doctoral research in parents' caring practices.

Research and career 
Chesla studied how families and family culture impact health. She studied how family-related issues, such as conflict and family isolation, impact risk factors for chronic conditions. Evidence indicates that family traits such as emotional closeness and supportive relationships are protective against issues such as depression, migraines and schizophrenia. Chesla decided to investigate the aspects of family life that contributed to the management of chronic conditions. In particular, Chesla studied families from a broad array of cultural backgrounds, and identified how certain models of care can clash with family processes. In 2008, Chesla was named the Thelma Shobe Endowed Chair in Ethics and Spirituality. She served as Chair of the Department of Family Health Care Nursing until 2017.

Awards and honors 
 2003 Fellow of the American Academy of Nursing
 2007 Distinguished Contributions to Family Nursing Research
 2008 Thelma Shobe Endowed Chair in Ethics and Spirituality
 2011 UCSF School of Nursing Excellence in Teaching
 2013 UCSF School of Medicine Helen Nahm Research Lecture

Selected publications

Books

References 

American nurses
University of California, San Francisco faculty
College of Saint Teresa alumni
University of Washington alumni
University of California, San Francisco alumni
Living people
Year of birth missing (living people)